Sound of Sunforest is the first and only studio album by the English psychedelic folk group, Sunforest. The tracks have arrangements with medieval and electric sounds in a psychedelic style. The band's material offered diverse and unique sound; but without a hit single, the album did not sell successfully.

Session musicians Big Jim Sullivan and Herbie Flowers, along with multiple other classical musicians, took part in recording. Two tracks from the album, "Overture to the Sun" and "Lighthouse Keeper" were re-recorded by the band to be used in Stanley Kubrick's A Clockwork Orange. The soundtrack album credits the tracks to Terry Tucker and Erika Eigen.

Popularity

Upon the album's initial release it did not sell well, most likely because none of the tracks became a hit single and also because of the multiple musical styles being featured. In October 2004, a section about Sunforest was published in the British magazine Record Collector; copies of the original record started to fetch more than $100. Despite low sales, its use by Stanley Kubrick has given a hint of immortality to Sound of Sunforest, and the album has been re-pressed multiple times, starting from 2000.

Musical style

Even though there is a distinct progressive musical direction throughout the whole album, it contains tracks of very different nature, which is why it is difficult to attribute a definite style to Sunforest.

The track "Overture to the Sun" was written like a Renaissance piece, whereas "Lighthouse Keeper" is rather pop. "Garden Rug" includes a bit of fanfare, while in "All in good time", we can hear excerpts of the kyrie in Latin. Last, "Magician in the Mountain" sets a contrast with its funk, jazz and groove tones.

External use of tracks

In 1971, the track "Overture to the Sun" was used by Stanley Kubrick in the movie A Clockwork Orange. It is played in the scene that follows Alex's exposure to the Ludovico Technique, when he is assaulted in public to demonstrate his lack of a violent reaction. The piece is written in a Renaissance-like style, and its elegance constitutes a counterpoint to the violence of the scene. Later in the film, when Alex comes back home to his parents, "Lighthouse Keeper" is played. This song, which is cheerful and cute but frivolous compared to the compositions of Beethoven that Alex listens to, is thought to emphasize the lack of taste of his parents.

Terry Tucker, with the help of Vic Smith, recorded a pop remix of "Overture To The Sun", which was released as a single in 1973 by Warner Brothers and credited to Terry Tuckers Orange Clockwork. 

In 1995, when the series The Maxx was first shown on MTV, it included "Lighthouse Keeper", but when the series was released on VHS and then on DVD, the song was replaced with another one, probably for copyright reasons.

In 1994, the band Ancient Rites used "Overture To The Sun" as intro for their track "Morbid Glory".

In 1999, the band Blood Axis used "Overture To The Sun" for their track "Lord of Ages".

In 2008, a 50-second shortened version of "Lighthouse Keeper" was used by Marks & Spencer for advertising in the UK. This appearance allowed the track to get popularised, as the statistics from Shazam (a smartphone app to identify songs on the fly) tend to show. The song has indeed been the 22nd most identified song from Monday 25 March to Monday 31 March 2008.

In 2014, "Lighthouse Keeper" appeared in the movie Frank, performed by Maggie Gyllenhaal.

Re-pressed discs and records released

Sound of Sunforest has had at least six reissues since 2000; some of them are non-official bootlegs.

When the album first came out in January 1970, in the UK, it had the label "Deram Nova" which is a sub-label of Deram Records, itself sub-label of Decca Records. At that time, Decca was in competition with EMI, and the Nova series allowed it to release new kinds of music.

Then came the re-presses:

Track listing

Footnotes and references
Footnotes

References

External links

1969 debut albums
Sunforest (band) albums
Decca Records albums
A Clockwork Orange